Aplothorax burchelli is a species of beetle in the family Carabidae, the only species in the genus Aplothorax. It is endemic to the island of Saint Helena in the South Atlantic. The genus has been found to be nested within Calosoma by phylogenomic analysis.

References

Carabinae
Monotypic Carabidae genera